Veshka Point (‘Nos Vishka’ \'nos 'vish-ka\) is the point projecting 1.4 km into Dimitrov Cove on the north coast of Velingrad Peninsula, Graham Coast in Graham Land, Antarctica, and separating the glacier termini of Hoek Glacier to the southwest and Rusalka Glacier to the northeast.  It is named after Veshka Peak in the Rhodope Mountains, Bulgaria.

Location
British mapping in 1971.

Maps
 Antarctic Digital Database (ADD). Scale 1:250000 topographic map of Antarctica. Scientific Committee on Antarctic Research (SCAR). Since 1993, regularly upgraded and updated.
British Antarctic Territory. Scale 1:200000 topographic map. DOS 610 Series, Sheet W 65 64. Directorate of Overseas Surveys, Tolworth, UK, 1971.

References
 Bulgarian Antarctic Gazetteer. Antarctic Place-names Commission. (details in Bulgarian, basic data in English)
Veshka Point. SCAR Composite Antarctic Gazetteer.

External links
 Veshka Point. Copernix satellite image

Headlands of Graham Land
Bulgaria and the Antarctic
Graham Coast